The southeastern slimy salamander (Plethodon grobmani) is a species of salamander in the family Plethodontidae. It is endemic to the United States, where it is distributed in the Southeastern United States from southern Georgia west to Alabama and south to central Florida. Its natural habitats are steephead valleys, maritime forests and bottomland hardwood forests.

References 

Amphibians of the United States
Plethodon
Amphibians described in 1949
Endemic fauna of the United States